A doodle is a drawing made while a person's attention is otherwise occupied. Doodles are simple drawings that can have concrete representational meaning or may just be composed of random and abstract lines or shapes, generally without ever lifting the drawing device from the paper, in which case it is usually called a scribble.

Doodling and scribbling are most often associated with young children and toddlers, because their lack of hand–eye coordination and lower mental development often make it very difficult for any young child to keep their coloring attempts within the line art of the subject. Despite this, it is not uncommon to see such behavior with adults, in which case it is generally done jovially, out of boredom.
Typical examples of doodling are found in school notebooks, often in the margins, drawn by students daydreaming or losing interest during class. Other common examples of doodling are produced during long telephone conversations if a pen and paper are available.

Popular kinds of doodles include cartoon versions of teachers or companions in a school, famous TV or comic characters, invented fictional beings, landscapes, geometric shapes, patterns, textures, or phallic scenes. Most people who doodle often remake the same shape or type of doodle throughout their lifetime.

Etymology
The word doodle first appeared in the early 17th century to mean a fool or simpleton. It may derive from the German Dudeltopf or Dudeldop, meaning simpleton or noodle (literally "nightcap"). It is the origin of the early eighteenth-century verb to doodle, meaning "to swindle or to make a fool of". The modern meaning emerged as a term for a politician who was doing nothing in office at the expense of his constituents.  That led to the more generalized verb "to doodle", which means to do nothing.

In the final courtroom scene of the 1936 film Mr. Deeds Goes to Town, the main character explains the concept of "doodling" to a judge unfamiliar with the word, saying that "People draw the most idiotic pictures when they're thinking." The character, who has travelled from a fictional town in Vermont, describes the word doodler as being "a name we made up back home" for people who make "foolish designs" on paper when their mind is on something else.

The meaning "fool, simpleton" is intended in the song title "Yankee Doodle", originally sung by British colonial troops during the American Revolutionary War.

Effects on memory
According to a study published in the scientific journal Applied Cognitive Psychology, doodling can aid a person's memory by expending just enough energy to keep one from daydreaming, which demands a lot of the brain's processing power, as well as from not paying attention. Thus, it acts as a mediator between the spectrum of thinking too much or thinking too little and helps focus on the current situation. The study was done by Professor Jackie Andrade, of the School of Psychology at the University of Plymouth, who reported that doodlers in her experiment recalled 7.5 pieces of information (out of 16 total) on average, 29% more than the average of 5.8 recalled by the control group made of non-doodlers.

Doodling has positive effects on human comprehension as well.  Creating visual depictions of information allows for a deeper understanding of material being learned. When doodling, a person is engaging neurological pathways in ways that allow for effective and efficient sifting and processing of information. For these reasons, doodling is used as an effective study tool and memory device.

As a therapeutic device 
Doodling can be used as a stress relieving technique. This is similar to other motor activities such as fidgeting or pacing that are also used to alleviate mental stress. According to a review of over 9,000 submitted doodles, nearly 2/3 of respondents recalled doodling when in a "tense or restless state" as a means to reduce those feelings. Scientists believe that doodling's stress relieving properties arise from the way that the act of doodling engages with the brain's default mode network. According to graphologist and behavior specialist Ingrid Seger-Woznicki, "we [doodle] because we’re problem solving on an unconscious level" and seeking to "create our life without stressing about it". Doodling, like the more organised activity of drawing patterns such as Zentangles, is often incorporated into art therapy, allowing its users to slow down, focus and de-stress.

Notable doodlers

Alexander Pushkin's notebooks are celebrated for their superabundance of marginal doodles, which include sketches of friends' profiles, hands, and feet. These notebooks are regarded as a work of art in their own right. Full editions of Pushkin's doodles have been undertaken on several occasions. Some of Pushkin's doodles were animated by Andrei Khrzhanovsky and Yuriy Norshteyn in the 1987 film My Favorite Time.

Other notable literary doodlers have included: Samuel Beckett; the poet and physician John Keats, who doodled in the margins of his medical notes; Sylvia Plath; and the Nobel laureate (in literature, 1913) poet Rabindranath Tagore, who made numerous doodles in his manuscript.

Mathematician Stanislaw Ulam developed the Ulam spiral for visualization of prime numbers while doodling during a boring presentation at a mathematics conference.

Many American Presidents, including Thomas Jefferson, Ronald Reagan, and Bill Clinton, have been known to doodle during meetings.

A portfolio featuring American Presidents' doodles while in office, including those of Herbert Hoover, John F. Kennedy, Dwight D. Eisenhower, Lyndon B. Johnson, Richard Nixon, Ronald Reagan, can be found in Presidential Doodles: Two Centuries of Scribbles, Scratches, Squiggles & Scrawls from the Oval Office, introductions by Paul Collins and David Greenberg (New York: Cabinet Books and Basic Books, 2006)
Some doodles and drawings can be found in notebooks of Leonardo da Vinci.

See also
 Asemic writing
 Automatic writing
 Drolleries
 Fidgeting
 Graffiti
 Graphology
 Marginalia
 Memory and retention in learning
 Recall (memory)
 Sketch (drawing)
 Stick figure
 Stream of consciousness writing
 Ulam spiral

References

Further reading

 
 
 
 
 
 
 

Drawing
Graphology